The 2017 Tour of Austria was the 70th edition of the Tour of Austria cycling stage race. The race was ranked 2.1 as part of the 2018 UCI Europe Tour.

Belgian cyclist Ben Hermans, of the  team, won the race overall. Pernsteiner's teammate, Giovanni Visconti, won the points classification, while Australian rider Aaron Gate, of the  team, took home the mountains classification jersey.

Teams
Twenty teams competed in the 2018 Tour of Austria, among them four UCI WorldTeams, nine UCI Professional Continental teams, and seven UCI Continental teams. Most teams started with seven riders; however,  and  started with only six.

UCI Continental Teams

 
 
 
 
 
 Tirol Cycling Team

Route

Stages

Stage 1
7 July 2018 – Feldkirch to Feldkirch,

Stage 2
8 July 2018 – Feldkirch to Fulpmes/Telfes,

Stage 3
9 July 2018 – Kufstein to Kitzbüheler Horn,

Stage 4
10 July 2018 – Kitzbühel to Prägraten,

Stage 5
11 July 2018 – Matrei to Grossglockner,

Stage 6
12 July 2018 – Knittelfeld to Wenigzell,

Stage 7
13 July 2018 – Waidhofen/Ybbs to Sonntagberg,

Stage 8
14 July 2018 – Scheibbs to Wels,

Classification leadership

Final classification standings

General classification

Points classification

Mountains classification

Team classification

Notes

References

External links
 

2018
2018 in Austrian sport
2018 UCI Europe Tour